Bertil Tallberg (September 17, 1883 – April 20, 1963) was a Finnish sailor who competed in the 1912 Summer Olympics. He was a crew member of the Finnish boat Lucky Girl, which won the bronze medal in the 8 metre class.

References

External links
profile

1883 births
1963 deaths
Finnish male sailors (sport)
Sailors at the 1912 Summer Olympics – 8 Metre
Olympic sailors of Finland
Olympic bronze medalists for Finland
Olympic medalists in sailing
Medalists at the 1912 Summer Olympics